Protodiptera is an extinct suborder of mecopteran insects containing the two families Permotanyderidae and Permotipulidae with a total of four genera Choristotanyderus, Permila, Permotanyderus and Permotipula.

References

External links
 David Grimaldi, Michael S. Engel. Evolution of the insects.

 
Permian insects
Extinct insect orders
Permian first appearances
Mecoptera